Diodora calyculata is a species of sea snail, a marine gastropod mollusk in the family Fissurellidae, the keyhole limpets and slit limpets.

Description
The size of the shell varies between 15 mm and 26 mm.

Distribution
This species occurs in the Indian Ocean from Cape Agulhas to South Transkei, South Africa

References

 Trew, A., 1983. The Melvill-Tomlin Collection. Handlists of the Molluscan Collections in the Department of Zoology, National Museum of Wales. Parts 19, 20 & 21. Pleurotomariacea, Fissurellacea and Patellacea.

External links
 To World Register of Marine Species
 

Fissurellidae
Gastropods described in 1823